Chiravarampathu Kavu Temple enshrines Bhagawati, the mother Goddess, one of the most popular deities in Kerala. The town of Aruvayi, Pazhanji is near the city of Kunnamkulam. The annual festival here is celebrated on the second Sunday of Kumbha (February). Over 35 committees are involved and over 75 elephants participate in this festival.

See also

Hindu temples in Thrissur district
Bhagavathi temples in Kerala